The Alfa Romeo Giulia (Type 952) is a compact executive car produced by the Italian automobile manufacturer Alfa Romeo. It was unveiled in June 2015, with market launch scheduled for February 2016, and it is the first saloon offered by Alfa Romeo after the production of the 159 ended in 2011. The Giulia is also the first mass-market Alfa Romeo vehicle in over two decades to use a longitudinal rear-wheel drive platform, since the 75 which was discontinued in 1992. The Giulia was second in 2017 European Car of the Year voting and was named Motor Trend Car of the Year for 2018. In 2018, Giulia was awarded the Compasso d'Oro industrial design award.

History
The car was designed at the Centro Stile Alfa Romeo, by a team headed by Marco Tencone and including Senior Exterior Designer, Andrea Loi. along with Interior Chief Designer Inna Kondakova and Senior Interior Designer Manuele Amprimo. The Giulia has been the subject of a long gestation and delayed launch dates, reportedly due to the design being sent back to the drawing board by Sergio Marchionne, CEO of Fiat Chrysler Automobiles (FCA), the parent company of Alfa Romeo at the time.

The new Giulia was unveiled to the press at the Museo Storico Alfa Romeo in Arese, on 24 June 2015, at an event which involved only the top-of-the-range Quadrifoglio variant and a rendition of "Nessun dorma" by Italian tenor Andrea Bocelli. The occasion coincided with the company's 105th anniversary, and also saw the company debut a restyled logo for all future Alfa Romeo models. The Giulia was also presented under the new La meccanica delle emozioni slogan ("the mechanics of emotions" in Italian).

The Giulia is the first model in the company's relaunch plan, which involves a €5 billion investment for an eight car line-up and a worldwide sales target of 400,000 by 2018 — up from 74,000 in 2013. It is underpinned by an all-new, longitudinal-engine, rear-wheel drive platform developed for Alfa Romeo — codenamed "Giorgio".
Development of the Giulia, along with development of the entire "Giorgio" project, has been overseen by the technical director of Ferrari, Philippe Krief.

Overview

The Giulia uses a front-engine, rear-wheel-drive layout, featuring an even 50% front and 50% rear weight distribution.
Suspension is independent all-around, of the double wishbone type at the front and multilink at the rear.
All Giulia models employ a carbon-fibre drive shaft made by Hitachi Automotive Systems, as well as aluminium alloy shock towers, suspension components, front wings and doors. All-wheel drive models will also be offered.

Depending on trim level it has a 6.5-inch or 8.8-inch colour display; optional Sport, Performance and Luxury Packs are also available. The sport package includes sports steering wheel with added grip, aluminium inserts on the dashboard, centre console and door panels, and Xenon headlights. The luxury package offers premium leather upholstery and wood trim. The performance package includes mechanical limited-slip differential along with electronic suspension and paddle shifters on the steering column in the cars equipped with an automatic transmission.

Models

Giulia, Super and Speciale 

The base Giulia, mid-level Super, and fully loaded Speciale are powered by a  2 litre gasoline engine, or the choice of 136 PS, 150 PS or 180 PS 2.2 litre turbo diesel engine. The base model comes with 16 inch alloys, the Super can be distinguished with 17 inch alloys and dual chrome exhaust tip for the diesel model. The Speciale has 18 inch alloys, black brake calipers, and leather sports seats from the Veloce.

Veloce and Veloce Ti 

The Giulia Veloce was presented at the 2016 Paris International Motor Show held in October. The Veloce offers the choice of two engines: the 2.0-litre turbo petrol and the 2.2-litre diesel inline-4 engines, both equipped with an 8-speed automatic transmission and Alfa Q4 all-wheel drive system (rear-wheel-drive in the UK).

The Veloce has specific bumpers and a glossy black door trim; it has also various performance components like special rear extractor with double exhaust pipes and optional 5-spoke 19-inch alloy wheels (the 19-inch option is not available in the UK). On the interior, it has black, red or tan leather sport seats and a sports steering wheel with a suede grip, aluminium inserts on the dashboard, central tunnel, door panels and Xenon headlights.

It has MultiAir electro-hydraulic valve activation system along with "2-in-1" " turbocharger system and direct injection with a 200-bar high pressure system. The  diesel all aluminium straight-4 engine comes with MultiJet II technology and electrically operated variable geometry turbocharger.

The Alfa Q4 all wheel drive system behaves like a rear-wheel drive vehicle: 100% of torque is distributed to the rear axle. As it reaches the wheel adherence limit, the system transfers up to 60% of the torque to the front axle. To ensure maximum speed of response in re-distributing torque, the system exploits a high mechanical over slippage (up to 2.5%) between the two axles, which translates into segment-beating vehicle control in terms of traction and directional stability on bends.

Quadrifoglio 

The top-of-the-line Giulia Quadrifoglio (Italian for "four-leaf clover") was the first model in the new Giulia range. It was unveiled at Italy in June 2015. It made its official international debut at the 2015 Frankfurt Motor Show. The Quadrifoglio's main competitors are cars such as the Mercedes-AMG C63, BMW M3 and the Cadillac ATS-V.

The turbochargers are single-scroll compressor IHI units integrated into the manifold, with water-charge air coolers. It has side-mounted direct fuel injection and the peak turbo boost reaches up to  absolute pressure.

The Quadrifoglio weighs  and has a power-to-weight ratio of /PS. This is achieved courtesy of the Quadrifoglio sharing the other models' composite and light alloy construction, as well as featuring a roof and bonnet made of carbon fibre.

 

From the front, the Quadrifoglio distinguishes itself from the rest of the range by a specific front bumper — with a carbon fibre splitter and enlarged air intakes for the twin intercoolers and for the brakes — and by a bonnet featuring two cooling outlets for the engine bay. On the sides, the front wings also have outlets to extract air from the wheel wells, and bear Quadrifoglio badges; the side skirts are specific to the model, as are the 19-inch alloy wheels. At the rear, a low-profile carbon fibre lip-spoiler is applied to the boot lid, and a rear diffuser makes up the lower half of the bumper, flanked by quadruple exhaust tips. Working in conjunction with the faired-in underside, the diffuser is fully functional in generating downforce — as at the front is the "Active Aero Splitter", which can vary its angle of attack by 10°, moved by electric motors.

Mechanically, this model is fitted with a torque vectoring rear differential able to send 100% of the torque to the left or right wheel, and an 8-speed automatic transmission manufactured by ZF, with a six-speed manual transmission available as an option in European markets. The braking system uses carbon ceramic rotors, along with six-piston front and four-piston rear calipers and auxiliary rear calipers for the parking brake. The electronic stability control and the traditional brake booster are combined in a single electromechanical system.

On the interior, the dashboard is part-trimmed in leather and carbon fibre and the engine start button is located on the multi-function steering wheel. In addition, the driver is offered Alfa Romeo's "DNA" dynamic control selector, which is placed on the centre console. Driving modes include "Dynamic", "Natural" and "Advanced Efficiency" modes (the last one uses cylinder deactivation for increased fuel economy), and "Race" (for high performance — with louder exhaust note and all electronic stability control systems turned off).

Performance
This model also completed the Nürburgring's Nordschleife circuit in 7 minutes 39 seconds, a record for a saloon car. In September 2016 a new lap record for the automatic transmission version was published: 7 minutes, 32 seconds. In Motor Trend Head 2 Head (Ep. 85) the Quadrifoglio won, over the BMW M3 Competition. In the same episode it was also rated better than Mercedes-AMG C63 and Cadillac ATS-V. The track test was performed at Chuckwalla Valley Raceway. The Quadrifoglio was also previewed in The Grand Tour TV series in January 2017. It completed a lap of the show's test track only 1.1 seconds behind the new all-wheel-drive Honda NSX - both driven on a wet track - an excellent performance for a rear-wheel-drive car. The Quadrifoglio went around the Top Gear test track in 1:21.40.

Quadrifoglio NRING Edition 

At the 2018 Geneva Motor Show, the Giulia Quadrifoglio NRING Edition was introduced. The NRING edition has carbon-ceramic brakes, Sparco carbon fibre seats, carbon fibre interior trim, a Mopar-branded gear shifter and Mopar floor mats. The car is differentiated on the exterior by 'NRING' badges as well as carbon fibre mirror caps and side skirts and an exposed carbon fibre roof. The equipment was upgraded to include adaptive cruise control and a premium sound system.

Quadrifoglio Racing Edition 

At the 2019 Geneva Motor Show the Alfa Romeo Racing limited edition was introduced, which celebrates Alfa Romeo's legendary racing history and the entry of a new Italian driver in Formula 1 competition: Antonio Giovinazzi joining the "Alfa Romeo Racing" team together with the 2007 F1 World Champion Kimi Räikkönen. This special edition has exclusive paintwork, as a tribute to the Alfa Romeo Racing C38 Formula 1 car. It has also some stylistic details like some carbon fibre aerodynamic parts and an Akrapovič titanium exhaust system.

Giulia Advanced Efficiency 
At the 2016 Paris Motor Show the Giulia's economic version called "AE" - Advanced Efficiency was unveiled. The AE was available with the Giulia and Giulia Super trim levels, it has  diesel engine and an 8-speed automatic transmission. It has some specific technical solutions to achieve these values like implementation of a low-pressure EGR valve that improves engine efficiency, an air-water intercooler, a secondary engine cooling circuit in addition to the primary circuit, and specific gearbox ratios. The Giulia "AE" Advanced Efficiency is fitted with specific 205/60 R16 tyres for reducing rolling resistance. It was discontinued beginning with 2019 model year.

B-Tech Special Edition 
In September 2018, the B-Tech Special Edition for Europe was announced which similar as Nero Edizione edition unveiled earlier for North American markets. The package adds a selection of visual and technological features to Giulia. Front grille, mirror caps and exhaust are finished in gloss black. Adaptive Cruise Control, an 8.8-inch infotainment system with sat-nav, Apple CarPlay and Android Auto as well as Bi-xenon headlights with washers are also the part of the package.

GTA and GTAm 

On 2 March 2020, Alfa Romeo introduced two new GTA and GTAm models which would have a limited production run of 500 units. The GTA and GTAm versions are developed to celebrate the marque's 110th anniversary in 2020, and pay tribute to one of the most emblematic automobile of Alfa Romeo: Giulia GTA. The GTA and GTAm can accelerate from 0 to 100 km/h in 3.6 seconds, with launch control. The GTAm is a track focused model and as a result has two seats, racing harnesses, and Lexan side and rear windows. The car is fitted with single nut wheels for weight reduction measures. Broader fenders cover the additional width. New springs, shocks, and bushings update the suspension as further means to improve the handling. Buyers will also receive a “personalized experience package” which includes a Bell racing helmet in special GTA livery, a full racing suit by Alpinestars, a personalized Goodwool car cover, and a specific driving course devised by the Alfa Romeo Driving Academy.

Modifications to the engine include higher boost pressure from the turbochargers, an Akrapovič exhaust system and redesigned pistons to ensure constant power and reliability: the piston cooling system now uses four oil jets instead of two as is the case on Quadrifoglio model.

North American models 
As of 2022, the Giulia is offered as Giulia, Giulia Ti (for Turismo internazionale), Veloce, and Quadrifoglio trims in the United States. Some models are available with Alfa's Q4 all-wheel-drive system and with the eight-speed automatic transmission with paddle shifters mounted on the steering column (providing a shift time less than 100 milliseconds). The eight-speed automatic transmission is co-developed with ZF.

The Veloce has more features than the Ti, while the Ti has more features than the so-called base model, although all models have the same engine 2.0-liter, turbocharged four-cylinder engine. The AWD system is optional and the only transmission option is an eight-speed automatic. The  Quadrifoglio is also in the Giulia lineup for the United States.

The first US deliveries of the Giulia took place in September 2016, making it the first Alfa Romeo saloon sold in North America since 1995.

Giulia Nero Edizione’ Package 
At the 2018 New York International Auto Show, the Nero Edizione’ Package for the Giulia was announced. The package includes a new exterior appearance through special blacked-out wheels, badging, and other touches.

Police car

The Polizia di Stato took delivery of two Alfa Romeo Giulia Veloce police patrol cars finished in a light blue paint with white stripes on the sides of the car with the words POLIZIA in block letters underneath together with the new Alfa Romeo Giulietta and the Jeep Renegade police cars.

The Carabinieri took delivery of two Alfa Romeo Giulia Quadrifoglios wrapped in navy blue paint, that appear virtually black. They sport red stripes over the car and have flashing lights over the chin spoilers with a white roof. Carabinieri cars are equipped with defibrillator, special portable cooling units, special radio system, additional emergency devices, a long weapon holder and rechargeable LED torches placed in the passenger compartment.

Giulia ETCR

The Romeo Ferraris racing team and Hexathron Racing Systems announced in December 2019 they were developing a Giulia-based electric touring car racer for the PURE ETCR series. The inaugural season was held in 2021 and the car was campaigned again in 2022.

The Giulia ETCR was designed and engineered by Hexathron under lead engineer Maurizio Soro. As required by ETCR rules, the spec drivetrain and battery are supplied by ETCR promoters WSC Technology, with a rear-drive configuration featuring electronic torque vectoring and output power of up to  peak and  continuous.

Giulia SWB Zagato
Unveiled in December 2022, the Alfa Romeo Giulia SWB Zagato is a one-off two-door model based on the Giulia, but with a shortened wheelbase, Tonale headlights and the GTAm special edition engine mated to a six-speed manual gearbox.

Engines and performance

The base models consist of four-cylinder petrol engines, as well as four-cylinder turbo diesel engines.
The Quadrifoglio uses the V6 Alfa-Romeo 690T engine, as described above. The petrol engines are built in FCA Italy's Termoli plant. Diesel engines are built in the Pratola Serra plant.

The first models went on sale from February 2016 were the 2.2 L Multijet II turbodiesel and the 2.9 L V6 Quadrifoglio. A 2.0 L MultiAir2 turbo petrol engine was announced at the time of the Giulia Quadrifoglio's debut at the Los Angeles Auto Show in November 2015. The 2.0 litre gasoline engines are part of the all new FCA Global Medium Engine (GME) family. The Alfa version will share up to 70% parts with the GME family for other FCA brands.

Engines and performance (North American models)

Model year changes

2019 model year 
All models now come with an 8.8-inch infotainment system with Apple Car Play and Android Auto as standard. In addition, the Giulia Quadrifoglio engine was updated to include 6 port injectors following a shut down of the engine factory to update the production lines. Although the engine presented the same power as the previous version, it clearly outdated the previous engine without port injectors.

2020 model year 
The Giulia's 2020 model year version was first introduced in China. It has an updated interior with a new 8.8-inch touchscreen for the infotainment system, which now offers a Wi-Fi hotspot, over-the-air software upgrades, an integrated emergency call function, and a call assistant function. The interior now has a leather-wrapped multifunction steering wheel and a leather-wrapped gear lever.

2023 model year 
The 2023 Giulia adds a new top Competizione trim, like the Tonale SUV. The Giulia also adopts a 3x3 headlight similar to the Tonale with adaptive LED Matrix technology featuring adaptive lighting technology which adjusts the dipped beam according to the speed of the car and driving conditions.

The 2023 car also features a new ‘Trilobo’ grille to provide what Alfa Romeo refers to as a “strong family resemblance with the Tonale”, and new rear light clusters use smoked glass.

Inside the 2023 model has a new 12.3-inch digital dash with three different layouts: Evolved, Relax and Heritage. L2+ driving assistance is also available

Equipment and safety

All Giulia models have active safety systems as standard, including the Forward Collision Warning (FCW) with Autonomous Emergency Brake (AEB) and pedestrian detection, IBS (Integrated Brake System) based on Continental MK C1 electronic brake control system, Lane Departure Warning (LDW) and cruise control with speed limiter. The Giulia is the first car in the world to use Continental MK C1 electronic brake system.

Chassis Domain Control (CDC), developed with Magneti Marelli, coordinates and controls all the on-board electronics: Torque Vectoring, Active Aero Splitter, active suspension, brakes, steering and ESC system — according to the mode selected by the driver using the new Alfa DNA Pro.

The Giulia was crash tested in June 2016 by EuroNCAP, with a score of 98% for the adult occupant protection — at the time the highest score ever achieved by any car, even with the introduction of a more stringent rating system in 2015. Overall the Giulia achieved five star results.

The Giulia was awarded on October 3, 2017, the Top Safety Pick+ award by Insurance Institute for Highway Safety (IIHS). The Giulia achieved the highest possible rating in each of the five tests. The TSP+ designation applies to any 2017 model-year Alfa Romeo Giulia produced after May 2017 equipped with Forward Collision Warning-Plus – an option at only $500 MSRP – and bi-xenon projector headlamps (35W) featuring adaptive forward lighting and auto-leveling.

Production
The car is assembled at FCA Italy's Cassino Plant in the province of Frosinone,  Central Italy. Pre-series production emerged in late August 2015, with full production and sales originally scheduled for November 2015 and February 2016, respectively. The official production of the Giulia started on 19 April 2016. The Alfa Romeo's Cassino plant manufactures the Giulia saloon, Stelvio SUV and Giulietta compact car. On 6 December 2018 Giulia reached the milestone of 100,000 units produced. The event was honored with the presence of the Italian Ambassador to Thailand, H. E. Lorenzo Galanti and TICC President Mr. Federico Cardini as attendees witnessed the debut of the 2018 Alfa Romeo Giulia in Thailand.

Sales

Awards
The highly awarded production car, has received many awards from automotive industry groups and media publishers, including following:

EuroCarBody Award 2016
Auto Europa 2017
Das Goldene Lenkrad: The most beautiful car of 2016
2017 Driver's Choice Award for Best New Luxury Car
2017 Auto del Año (Car of the Year) in Mid-size Sedan Segment by Hispanic Motor Press
2016 BBC Top Gear Magazine Awards:Car of the Year' title and the inaugural public vote for 'Car of 2016'
Best Car 2017 - German magazine Auto, Motor und Sport
Croatian Auto Klub magazine award: Croauto 2017
2017 Newcomer of the Year, Quattroruote
All-new 2017 Alfa Romeo Giulia Quadrifoglio Named Best "Luxury Performance Car" of 2017 by New York Daily News Autos Team
Wards 10 Best Interiors 
2017 Alfa Romeo Giulia Quadrifoglio Wins "Super Sedan" in Popular Mechanics’ Automotive Excellence Awards
2017 10 Best Interiors List by WardsAuto
2017 Alfa Romeo Giulia Quadrifoglio named "Car of Texas" and "Performance Sedan of Texas" and took home "Most Drives" honor
2017 Sport Auto Award 2017 - German car magazine "Sport Auto"
2017 Evo Car of the Year best sports saloon 
2017 Evo Car of the Year best super saloon
2018 Motor Trend Car of the Year
Car and Driver 10Best for 2018
2018 Car And Driver ‘Editors’ Choice’
Sport Auto Award 2018 Giulia Quadrifoglio top pick of category 'Imported Standard Sedans/Station Wagons up to 100,000 Euro' by Sport auto (Germany)
Sport Auto Award 2018 Giulia Veloce wins in category 'Imported Standard Sedans/Station Wagons up to 50,000 Euro'. by Sport auto (Germany)
2019 Readers' choice awards by the Auto, Motor und sport
2019 Auto Bild magazine win of "Design" category "Best Brands" competition.
2020 What Car? Performance Car of the Year

References

External links

 Alfa Romeo Giulia official website

Giulia (2015)
Police vehicles
Compact executive cars
Sports sedans
Rear-wheel-drive vehicles
Cars introduced in 2016
2020s cars
All-wheel-drive vehicles
Euro NCAP large family cars